Hjalmar Saxtorph (19 April 1883 – 24 April 1942) was a Danish freestyle swimmer. He competed at the 1906 Intercalated Games and the 1908 Summer Olympics.

References

External links
 

1883 births
1942 deaths
Danish male freestyle swimmers
Olympic swimmers of Denmark
Swimmers at the 1906 Intercalated Games
Swimmers at the 1908 Summer Olympics
Sportspeople from the Central Denmark Region